Pittsburgh Youth Ballet is a non-profit organization previously run by former Pittsburgh Ballet Theater ballerina Jean Gedeon. The School was founded in 1983, while the company was established in 1990. 
PYB alumnae have performed with the New York City Ballet and other professional dance companies.

In 2019, the Youth Pittsburgh Ballet changed its name to Texture Ballet School and is under the direction of Alan Obuzor.

References

External links
 

Education in Pittsburgh
Ballet schools in the United States
Non-profit organizations based in Pittsburgh
1983 establishments in Pennsylvania
Dance in Pennsylvania